Arsène Lupin is a fictional character who appears in a series of novels written by French writer Maurice Leblanc, as well as a number of non-canonical sequels and numerous film, television, stage play and comic book adaptations.

Arsène Lupin may also refer to:
 Arsène Lupin III, a Japanese fictional character from the Lupin III franchise
 Arsène Lupin (1909 film), a short film with Georges Tréville as Lupin
 Arsène Lupin (1914 film), with Georges Tréville as Lupin 
 Arsène Lupin (1916 film), with Gerald Ames as Lupin (UK)
 Arsene Lupin (1917 film), with Earle Williams as Lupin (US)
 Arsène Lupin (1932 film), with John Barrymore as Lupin (US)
 Arsène Lupin (2004 film), with Romain Duris as Lupin
 Arsène Lupin (TV series), a French TV show

See also
Lupin (disambiguation)